Abdelkader Moukhtatif (1934 – 4 August 2022) was a Moroccan footballer who played as a midfielder. He competed in the men's tournament at the 1964 Summer Olympics. He died on 4 August 2022.

References

External links
 
 

1934 births
2022 deaths
Moroccan footballers
Association football midfielders
Morocco international footballers
Olympic footballers of Morocco
Footballers at the 1964 Summer Olympics
Botola players
AS FAR (football) players
20th-century Moroccan people
21st-century Moroccan people
Place of birth missing